Blessed Sacrament School or Blessed Sacrament Catholic School may refer to:

Schools in Canada 
Blessed Sacrament School (Wainwright, Alberta)
Blessed Sacrament School (Vancouver), Vancouver, British Columbia
Blessed Sacrament Catholic School (Kitchener, Ontario), see Waterloo Catholic District School Board

Schools in the United States 

Blessed Sacrament School (Burlington, North Carolina)
Blessed Sacrament School (Denver, Colorado), Denver, Colorado

Blessed Sacrament School (Laredo, Texas)
Blessed Sacrament Catholic School (San Antonio, Texas), see List of education facilities in San Antonio

Blessed Sacrament School (Sandy, Utah)

Blessed Sacrament School (Washington, D.C.)
Blessed Sacrament School (Westminster, California)
Blessed Sacrament School (Savannah, Georgia)
Blessed Sacrament School (Sandy, Utah)
Blessed Sacrament School (Waterbury, Connecticut)

See also
Most Blessed Sacrament Elementary School (Kentucky)